There are more than 180 current and former places of worship in Chichester, the largest of seven local government districts in the English county of West Sussex.  Additionally, several former places of worship have been demolished.
For details of current places of worship, see List of current places of worship in Chichester District.
For details of former places of worship which survive in alternative use, see List of former places of worship in Chichester District.
Details of former places of worship which have been demolished are recorded in the countywide List of demolished places of worship in West Sussex.